Izzet Mehmed Pasha (1723 – February 1784, Belgrade) was an Ottoman statesman who served as the Grand Vizier of the Ottoman Empire twice, first from 1774 to 1775, and second from 1781 to 1782.

Towards the end of Russo-Turkish War (1768-1774), he was the sadaret kaymakamı, deputy to the grand vizier who served in the absence of the grand vizier. Sultan Abdülhamit I appointed him as grand vizier on 10 August 1774. His first term ended on 7 July 1775. Six years later, while he was serving as the governor of Erzurum Eyalet, he was reappointed as the grand vizier on 20 February 1781. His main task was reforming the army which was unsuccessful in the war. But in this task he failed to satisfy the sultan, and furthermore, a fire in Istanbul caused great damage and riots, leading to his dismissal by the sultan on 25 August 1782 and exile to Plovdiv.

Apart from the grand viziership, Izzet Mehmed Pasha also held other high-level posts. He became a vizier on 6 July 1774, and he served as the Ottoman governor of Aidin (1775), Egypt (1775–78), Sivas (1778–79), Erzurum (1779, 1780–81), Rakka (1779–80), and Belgrade (1783–84).

He died in February 1784 in Belgrade while in office as its governor.

See also
 List of Ottoman Grand Viziers
 List of Ottoman governors of Egypt
 Belgrade

References

1723 births
1784 deaths
18th-century Grand Viziers of the Ottoman Empire
18th-century Ottoman governors of Egypt
Ottoman governors of Egypt